Hempstead is the name of some places in the U.S. state of New York

Municipalities
Hempstead (village), New York, an incorporated village within the Town of Hempstead
Hempstead, New York, a town that encompasses the Village of Hempstead
Hempstead Plains, central Long Island in Nassau County
New Hempstead, New York, a village in the town of Ramapo
North Hempstead, New York, a town in Nassau County
Ramapo, New York, formerly known as New Hempstead and then Hampstead
South Hempstead, New York, a hamlet in Nassau County
West Hempstead, New York, a hamlet in Nassau County

Other uses
Hempstead Branch, an electrified rail line operated by the Long Island Rail Road

See also
Hempstead High School (disambiguation)